Shiv Narain Kureel, is an Indian pediatric surgeon, medical academic and writer, and the professor and Head of the Department of Pediatric Surgery at King George's Medical University, Lucknow (U.P).

Early life

Kureel was born on 02 November 1956 in Uttar Pradesh.

He is best known for the neonataogical and pediatric urological reconstructive surgeries.

Achievements
He conducted a research on exotrophy epispadias that was published on the first page of "The American Journal Urology Gold". It was a major achievement in the field of medical world from India.
He is reported to have pioneered the single stage surgical technique for congenital problems in India

He is credited with the performance of the first pediatric vaginal reconstructive surgery in India which was performed on an 11-year-old girl and a surgery on a two-year-old child to correct bladder exstrophy, a rare congenital abnormality. 

He is a life member and the president of the "Indian Association of Paediatric Surgeons" and also a reviewer of the Journal of Indian Association of Pediatric Surgeons, the official journal of the association.

He has also published several medical papers.

Awards
The Government of India awarded him with the fourth highest civilian honour of the Padma Shri, in 2016, for his contributions to medicine.

References

External links 
 
 

Recipients of the Padma Shri in medicine
1956 births
Indian paediatric surgeons
Indian medical academics
Indian medical writers
Indian medical administrators
Living people